Varel is a railway station located in Varel, Germany. The station is located on the Oldenburg–Wilhelmshaven railway. The train services are operated by NordWestBahn.

Train services
The following services currently call at the station:

Regional services 
Wilhelmshaven - Varel - Oldenburg - Cloppenburg - Bramsche - Osnabrück

Regional services 
Wilhelmshaven - Varel - Oldenburg - Hude - Delmenhorst - Bremen

References

External links 
 

Railway stations in Lower Saxony